Forty Boys and a Song is a 1941 American short documentary film about the Robert Mitchell Boys Choir. Directed by Irving Allen, it was nominated for an Academy Award at the 14th Academy Awards for Best Short Subject (One-Reel).

Cast
 Robert Mitchell as himself (as Bob Mitchell)
 Ken Carpenter as narrator

References

External links
 

1941 films
1940s short documentary films
1941 documentary films
Black-and-white documentary films
American short documentary films
American black-and-white films
Choral music
Films directed by Irving Allen
1940s English-language films
1940s American films